One News or 1News or variation, may refer to:

 RTÉ News: One O'Clock (Ireland)
 One News (TV channel), a Philippine-based news channel operated by Cignal TV
 1News (Malaysia), online TV service
 1 News, news division of New Zealand broadcaster TVNZ

See also

Channel One News (U.S.A.), content provider
Channel One News (India), news channel

NewsOne (disambiguation)
News (disambiguation)
One (disambiguation)